Fatehpur railway station  is on the Mughalsarai–Kanpur section of the Howrah–Delhi main line under Allahabad railway division. It is located in Fatehpur district in the Indian state of Uttar Pradesh. It serves Fatehpur and the surrounding areas.Other major station in the city of fatehpur are Aung, bindki road, kanspur guguali, Malwa, kurasti kalan, Ramva, Faizullapur, Rasulabad, Sath naraini, Khaga railway station.

History
The East Indian Railway Company initiated efforts to develop a railway line from Howrah to Delhi in the mid nineteenth century. Even when the line from Howrah to Mughalsarai was being constructed and only the lines near Howrah were put in operation, the first train ran from Allahabad to Kanpur in 1859 and the Kanpur–Etawah section was opened to traffic in the 1860s. For the first through train from Howrah to Delhi in 1864, coaches were ferried on boats across the Yamuna at Allahabad. With the completion of the Old Naini Bridge across the Yamuna  through trains started running in 1865–66.

Electrification
The Subedarganj–Manoharganj–Athasarai–Kanspur Gugauli-Panki and Chandari loops were electrified in 1966–67.

Amenities
Fatehpur railway station has 1 double-bedded non-AC retiring room.

References

External links
Trains at Fatehpur

Railway stations in Fatehpur district
Allahabad railway division
Fatehpur, Uttar Pradesh